The Phoenix Industries TZ-1 ParaFlyer is an American powered parachute that was designed  and produced by Phoenix Industries of Southampton, New Jersey. Now out of production, when it was available the aircraft was supplied as a kit for amateur construction.

Design and development
It features a  parachute-style wing single-place accommodation, tricycle landing gear and a single  Zenoah G-25 engine in pusher configuration.

The aircraft carriage is built from bolted aluminium tubing. In flight steering is accomplished via handles that actuate the canopy brakes, creating roll and yaw. On the ground the aircraft has foot pedal-controlled nosewheel steering. The main landing gear incorporates spring rod suspension. An instrument pod, including a tachometer, cylinder head temperature gauge and exhaust gas temperature gauge, was a factory option.

The aircraft can be folded up and transported in most automobiles. The manufacturer estimates the construction time from the supplied kit as 10 hours.

Specifications (TZ-1 ParaFlyer)

References

TZ-1
1990s United States sport aircraft
1990s United States ultralight aircraft
Single-engined pusher aircraft
Powered parachutes